Hiroki Oka (岡 大生, born April 18, 1988) is a Japanese football player who plays for Tochigi SC.

Club statistics
Updated to 23 February 2018.

References

External links
Profile at Ventforet Kofu

1988 births
Living people
Komazawa University alumni
Association football people from Aichi Prefecture
Japanese footballers
J1 League players
J2 League players
J3 League players
Ventforet Kofu players
JEF United Chiba players
Kataller Toyama players
Tochigi SC players
Association football goalkeepers
Universiade bronze medalists for Japan
Universiade medalists in football
Medalists at the 2009 Summer Universiade